Diego Cuenca (4 December 1927 – 1 January 2012) was a Spanish professional footballer who played as a left winger.

Honours 
Sedan-Torcy

 Division 2: 1954–55
 Coupe de France: 1955–56
 Challenge des Champions: 1956
 Coupe Charles Drago runner-up: 1955

References 

1927 births
2012 deaths
Footballers from Barcelona
Spanish footballers
Association football wingers
CS Sedan Ardennes players
US Forbach players
Canet Roussillon FC players

Ligue 2 players
Ligue 1 players
Spanish expatriate footballers
Expatriate footballers in France
Spanish expatriate sportspeople in France